Frederick Woodbridge (1797 in Bloomsbury, Middlesex – 1 October 1858 in St Leonards-on-Sea, Sussex) was an English amateur cricketer who made 9 known appearances in first-class cricket matches from 1815 until 1819.  He was the younger brother of Edward Woodbridge.

Career
He was mainly associated with Surrey.

In 1815, Woodbridge scored one of the earliest known first-class centuries at the new Lord's Cricket Ground in the Middlesex v Epsom match on 24 & 25 August when he and Felix Ladbroke made 107 and 116 respectively for Epsom.

References

External sources
 CricketArchive record

1797 births
1858 deaths
English cricketers
English cricketers of 1787 to 1825
Surrey cricketers
People from Bloomsbury
Epsom cricketers
Old Etonians cricketers